Buried Thunder is a young adult novel written by British author Tim Bowler. It was first published in 2011 in the UK. It is a psychological thriller whose central character is a fourteen-year-old girl called Maya who has just moved to the countryside with her parents and brother. She senses an evil presence in the hotel where they are living and makes a horrific discovery in the forest nearby.

References

External links
Tim Bowler
Oxford University Press
Book Zone

2011 British novels
British young adult novels
Novels by Tim Bowler
Novels set in hotels
Oxford University Press books